The Hiroshima Peace Memorial Museum is located in Hiroshima Peace Memorial Park, in central Hiroshima, Japan. It was established on August 24, 1955.  The vision of the museum is the complete international abolition of all nuclear weapons, and the promotion of world peace.  Fifty-three million people had visited the museum from its opening in 1955 through 2005. The number of visitors is over one million per year. Since the museum opened, there have been numerous visits, by heads of state, foreign dignitaries, political figures, peace activists, and various celebrities or other notable figures.

List of notable figures

 Title noted at remark are as of date of the visit.
Messages for Peace left by above visitors can be seen at Museum site.

See also
 Hiroshima Witness
 Nagasaki Atomic Bomb Museum
 Nagasaki National Peace Memorial Hall for the Atomic Bomb Victims
 Nagasaki Peace Park

References

External links
 Hiroshima Peace Memorial Museum official website
 Hiroshima National Peace Memorial Hall for the Atomic Bomb Victims 

Monuments and memorials concerning the atomic bombings of Hiroshima and Nagasaki
Peace Memorial Museum, visitors
Peace museums
World War II museums in Japan
World War II-related lists
Japan history-related lists